The Kouaoua River is a river of New Caledonia. At least one bridge and one set of electric conductors crosses the river.

See also
List of rivers of New Caledonia

References

Rivers of New Caledonia